Coutaric acid is a hydroxycinnamoyltartaric acid found in wine, pomace and grape. It is an ester formed from coumaric acid and tartaric acid.

References 

Hydroxycinnamic acid esters
Vinylogous carboxylic acids